This list includes corporations and their documented collaboration in the implementation of the Holocaust.

List

Gallery

See also 
 Circle of Friends of the Economy
 Virtual Library – a project of AICE: "Concentration Camps: List of major companies involved in the concentration camps"

References

External links 
 JewishVirtualLibrary.org: German Firms that Used Slave Labor During Nazi Era
 Jewish Virtual Library: List of Major Companies Involved in the Concentration Camps. Source: Yewish Virtual Library – A Project of AICE, Chevy Chase, Maryland

Companies
Holocaust
Companies
 
Collaboration with Nazi Germany